DHICA (5,6-dihydroxyindole-2-carboxylic acid) is an intermediate in the biosynthesis of melanin. It may tautomerise to form Dopachrome.

References 

Indole alkaloids